Peru competed at the 2020 Summer Paralympics from 24 August to 5 September 2021.

Medalists

Athletics

Rosbil Guillén has been selected to compete in the 2020 Summer Paralympics after obtaining the qualifying mark for the 2020 Summer Paralympcs at the 2019 Parapan American Games where he won the gold medal.

Badminton

Cycling 

Peru sent one male cyclist after successfully getting a slot in the 2018 UCI Nations Ranking Allocation quota for the Americas.

Road

Judo

Powerlifting

Swimming 

One Peruvian swimmer has successfully entered the paralympic slot after breaking the MQS. A second swimmer qualified via tripartite invitation.

Men's events

Women's events

Taekwondo

Peru qualified one athletes to compete at the Paralympics competition. Leonor Espinoza qualified by winning the gold medal at the 2020 Americas Qualification Tournament in San Jose, Costa Rica.

See also
Peru at the Paralympics
Peru at the 2020 Summer Olympics

References

Nations at the 2020 Summer Paralympics
2020
2021 in Peruvian sport